Sovran is a 2015 album by Draconian.
 

Sovran may also refer to:

Sovran Bank, American bank which operated 1983–1990

People with the surname
Gino Sovran (1924–2016), Canadian basketball player
Tamar Sovran (born 1948), Israeli linguist

Other 
Sovran Citizen
Sovran Self Storage

See also
Sovereign (disambiguation)